Sporting Clube de Portugal is a professional multi-sports club, with a roller hockey section, from Lisbon, Portugal.

Facilities

Pavilhão João Rocha
Pavilhão João Rocha is a multi-sports pavilion located in the parish of Lumiar, in Lisbon. Located next to the Estádio José Alvalade, it is the home of Sporting CP sports. In honor of one of the most distinguished figures in the history of Sporting, the pavilion was named after former club president, João Rocha, who remained in office from September 1973 to October 1986. Its inauguration took place on the day June 21, 2017.

Honours

National
Portuguese First Division: 9
1938–39, 1974–75, 1975–76, 1976–77, 1977–78, 1981–82, 1987–88, 2017–18, 2020–21

Portuguese Second Division: 3
1969–70, 2003–04, 2011–12

Portuguese Third Division: 2
1999–00, 2010–11

Portuguese Cup: 4
1975–76, 1976–77, 1983–84, 1989–90

Portuguese Super Cup: 2
1983, 2020

 Elite Cup
 Winners: 2016, 2018

International
Euroleague: 3
1976–77, 2018–19, 2020–21

World Skate Europe Cup: 2
1983–84, 2014–15

Cup Winners' Cup: 3
1980–81, 1984–85, 1990–91

Continental Cup: 2
2019, 2021

Current squad

References

External links
Official website

Sporting CP sports
Rink hockey clubs in Portugal